Lay Your Burden Down is a studio album by Buckwheat Zydeco, released in 2009 through Alligator Records. The album ranked number five on Billboards Top Blues Albums. In 2010, the album earned Buckwheat Zydeco the Grammy Award for Best Zydeco or Cajun Music Album. This is Buckwheat Zydeco's first record with Alligator Records and was produced by Steve Berlin, who produced his 1994 album Five Card Stud.

Track listing

Personnel
The album features the Buckwheat Zydeco and The Ils Sont Partis Band, usually shortened to just Buckwheat Zydeco.  In the album, this band included: 
Stanley "Buckwheat" Dural Jr. on accordion, Hammond B3 organ, synth keyboard, lead vocals & backing vocals; 
Sir Reginald Master Dural on rubboard, backing vocals; 
Michael Melchione on guitar; 
Olivier Scoazec on guitar; 
Curtis Watson on trumpet; 
Lee Allen Zeno on bass guitar, backing vocals;
Kevin Menard on drums.

Also, helped create the album:
Steve Berlin – baritone saxophone
Troy "Trombone Shorty" Andrews – trombone
John "J.J." Grey – backing vocal & Wurlitzer electric piano (on track 2)
Sonny Landreth – slide guitar (on tracks 1, 2)
Warren Haynes – slide guitar (on track 7)
David Farrell – engineer/mixer
Korey Richey - second engineer

References

2009 albums
Alligator Records albums
Grammy Award for Best Zydeco or Cajun Music Album